The Samuel Merrill House is a historic house located at 1285 N. Summit Ave. in Pasadena, California. Noted Pasadena architects Charles and Henry Greene designed the American Craftsman style house, which was built for conservationist Samuel Merrill in 1910. The single-story, "L"-shaped house is built from redwood and Arroyo stone, giving it a natural appearance; it also uses clinker brick for decoration. The house's gable roof features overhanging eaves and exposed rafter tails, characteristic features of Craftsman design. Several pairs of banded casement windows, many with wooden frames, are located throughout the facade. The house is considered one of the best-preserved small houses designed by Greene & Greene.

The house was added to the National Register of Historic Places on April 5, 2001.

References

Houses on the National Register of Historic Places in California
Houses completed in 1910
American Craftsman architecture in California
Buildings and structures on the National Register of Historic Places in Pasadena, California
Houses in Pasadena, California
Greene and Greene buildings